Douglas Slaten (February 4, 1980 – October 4, 2016) was an American professional baseball pitcher. He played in Major League Baseball (MLB) from 2006 to 2012 for the Arizona Diamondbacks, Washington Nationals, and Pittsburgh Pirates.

Amateur career
Slaten attended Venice High School, Glendale Community College, and Los Angeles Pierce College.

Professional baseball career
Slaten was drafted in the 29th round of the 1998 Major League Baseball draft by the Baltimore Orioles, but did not sign. The Orioles selected Slaten in the 34th round of the 1999 Major League Baseball draft, but he did not sign. Slaten was drafted in the 17th round of the 2000 Major League Baseball draft by the Arizona Diamondbacks and signed July 5, 2000.

Arizona Diamondbacks
Slaten was drafted in the 17th round of the 2000 Major League Baseball draft by the Arizona Diamondbacks and signed July 5, 2000. He spent the 2001 season with the Lancaster JetHawks. He split the 2002 season, between the South Bend Silver Hawks and Lancaster. In 2003, he played for the Lancaster JetHawks again. In 2004, he mostly pitched for South Bend, but also pitched for the AA El Paso Diablos. In 2005, he pitched for the AA Tennessee Smokies. In 2006, pitching for the Smokies, he was named a Southern League Mid-Season All-Star. In 2006, Slaten went 4-4 with a 1.43 ERA with 80 strikeouts in the minor leagues. Slaten made his major league debut on September 4,  for the Arizona Diamondbacks, against the Florida Marlins. He would finish the season not giving up a single earned run in 9 appearances. In , Slaten appeared in 61 games for the D-Backs and recorded a 2.72 ERA and helped the team win the NL West. He would come back for the 2009 season in Arizona but would only get to a career worst, 7.11 ERA in 11 games. Slaten would again be sent to the minors. Slaten was claimed off waivers by the Washington Nationals on November 4, 2009.

Washington Nationals
Slaten was claimed off waivers by the Washington Nationals on November 4, 2009. In his first year with the Nationals, Slaten had a career high 4 wins and also have a career high in number of innings pitched and strikeouts. Slaten would finish the season with a 3.10 ERA. Slaten would start off the 2011 season by not giving up a single run until his 15th appearance. He finished with a 4.41 ERA with 13 strikeouts and an 0-2 record in 16 1/3 innings.

Pittsburgh Pirates
Slaten signed a minor league contract with the Pittsburgh Pirates in January 2012. Slaten was assigned to the AAA Indianapolis Indians. On April 29, 2012, in a game between Indianapolis and the Durham Bulls, Slaten pitched the final inning of a combined no-hitter. Justin Wilson pitched the first 7 1/3 innings, and Jose Diaz got the final 2 outs in the 8th inning.  On May 28, he was called up and pitched in 10 games until on June 27, he was designated for assignment to make room for Oscar Tejeda. During the 10 games Slaten composed of a  2.77 ERA and 6 strikeouts.

SK Wyverns
Slaten signed a deal with the SK Wyverns in the KBO to be a starter, and then later cancelled his contract due to personal reasons.

Slaten died October 4, 2016.

References

External links

1980 births
2016 deaths
Arizona League Diamondbacks players
Lancaster JetHawks players
LAPC Brahma Bulls baseball players
Glendale Vaqueros baseball players
South Bend Silver Hawks players
El Paso Diablos players
Tennessee Smokies players
Tucson Sidewinders players
Reno Aces players
Syracuse Chiefs players
Gulf Coast Nationals players
Hagerstown Suns players
Harrisburg Senators players
Indianapolis Indians players
Arizona Diamondbacks players
Washington Nationals players
Pittsburgh Pirates players
Major League Baseball pitchers
Baseball players from Los Angeles
Venice High School (Los Angeles) alumni